Rex Ingram (born Reginald Ingram Montgomery Hitchcock, 15 January 1892 – 21 July 1950) was an Irish film director, producer, writer, and actor. Director Erich von Stroheim once called him "the world's greatest director".

Early life
Born in 58 Grosvenor Square, Rathmines, Dublin, Ireland, (where a plaque commemorates his birth), Ingram was educated at Saint Columba's College, near Rathfarnham, County Dublin. He spent much of his adolescence living in the Old Rectory, Kinnitty, Birr, County Offaly, where his father, Reverend Francis Hitchcock, was the Church of Ireland rector. Ingram emigrated to the United States in 1911.

His brother Francis joined the British Army and fought during World War I, during which he was awarded the Military Cross.

Career
Ingram studied sculpture at the Yale University School of Art, where he contributed to campus humour magazine The Yale Record. He soon moved into film, first taking acting work in 1913 and then writing, producing and directing. His first work as producer-director was in 1916 on the romantic drama The Great Problem. He worked for Edison Studios, Fox Film Corporation, Vitagraph Studios, and then MGM, directing mainly action or supernatural films.

He moved to Metro in 1920, where he was under the supervision of executive June Mathis. Mathis and Ingram would go on to make four films together: Hearts Are Trumps, The Four Horsemen of the Apocalypse, The Conquering Power, and Turn to the Right. It is believed the two were romantically involved. Ingram and Mathis had begun to grow distant when her new find, Rudolph Valentino, began to overshadow Ingram's own fame. Their relationship ended when Ingram eloped with Alice Terry in 1921.

Ingram married twice, first to actress Doris Pawn in 1917; this ended in divorce in 1920. He then married Alice Terry in 1921, with whom he remained for the rest of his life. Both marriages were childless. He and Terry relocated to the French Riviera in 1923. They formed a small studio in Nice and made several films on location in North Africa, Spain, and Italy, for MGM and others.

Amongst those who worked for Ingram at MGM on the Riviera during this period was the young Michael Powell, who later went on to direct (with Emeric Pressburger) The Red Shoes and other classics, and technician Leonti Planskoy. By Powell's own account, Ingram was a major influence on him, especially in regard to the themes of illusion, dreaming, magic and the surreal. David Lean said he was indebted to Ingram. MGM studio chief Dore Schary listed the top creative people in Hollywood as D. W. Griffith, Ingram, Cecil B. DeMille and Erich von Stroheim (in declining order of importance).

Carlos Clarens writes: "As Rex Ingram's films became more esoteric, his career declined. The coming of sound forced him to relinquish his studios in Nice. Rather than equip them for talking pictures, he chose instead to travel and pursue a writing career."

Ingram made only one talkie, Baroud, filmed for Gaumont British Pictures in Morocco. The film was not a commercial success; he then left the movie business, returning to Los Angeles to work as a sculptor and writer.

Interested in Islam as early as 1927, he converted to the faith in 1933.

For his contribution to the motion picture industry, he has a star on the Hollywood Walk of Fame at 1651 Vine Street.

Death
Ingram died of a cerebral hemorrhage in North Hollywood on 21 July 1950, aged 58. He was interred in the Forest Lawn Memorial Park Cemetery in Glendale, California.

Legacy
Critic Carlos Clarens wrote of Ingram: "A full-blown Irishman fascinated by the bizarre and the grotesque (he once employed a dwarf as a valet), Ingram was also a writer of some talent. Frequently pedestrian and pretentious, Ingram's films nevertheless contain splendid flashes of macabre fantasy, such as the ride of the Four Horsemen in the Valentino epic, or the 'ghoul visions' that bring about the death of the miser in The Conquering Power. His more or less mystical bent was apparent in Mare Nostrum and The Garden of Allah, which he filmed in the Mediterranean and North Africa, respectively."

Filmography
Ingram's complete filmography as a director:

 The Symphony of Souls (1-reel short subject; 1914)
 The Song of Hate (1915) *scenario
 The Great Problem (1916)
 Broken Fetters (1916)
 The Chalice of Sorrow (1916)
 Black Orchids (1917)
 The Little Terror (1917)
 The Reward of the Faithless (1917)
 The Pulse of Life (1917)
 The Flower of Doom (1917)
 His Robe of Honor (1918)
 Humdrum Brown (1918)
 The Day She Paid (1919)
 Shore Acres (1920)
 Under Crimson Skies (1920)
 Hearts Are Trumps (1920)
 The Four Horsemen of the Apocalypse (1921)
 The Conquering Power (1921)
 The Prisoner of Zenda (1922)
 Trifling Women (1922)
 Turn to the Right (1922)
 Scaramouche (1923)
 Where the Pavement Ends (1923)
 The Arab (1924)
 Mare Nostrum (1926)
 The Magician (1926)
 The Garden of Allah (1927)
 The Three Passions (1929)
 Baroud (1932)

References

External links

 Rex Ingram official website 
 
 Rex Ingram profile at Virtual History

1892 births
1950 deaths
20th-century Irish sculptors
Male sculptors
20th-century Irish male artists
Burials at Forest Lawn Memorial Park (Glendale)
Converts to Islam from Protestantism
Irish expatriates in the United States
Irish film directors
Irish Muslims
Irish sculptors
People educated at St Columba's College, Dublin
People from County Offaly
Yale University alumni
Irish former Christians
The Yale Record alumni